Ronnie Sue Lichtman, (born February 10, 1950) is a midwife, educator, writer and advocate for women's health. She has published widely for both lay and professional audiences. The Chair of the Midwifery Education Program at The State University of New York (SUNY) Downstate Medical Center in New York City, she earned a Ph.D. in sociomedical sciences from Columbia University Graduate School of Arts and Sciences, and her MS in Maternity Nursing with a specialization in midwifery from Columbia University School of Nursing. She previously directed the midwifery programs at Columbia University and Stony Brook University.

Ronnie Lichtman is a well-known speaker for a variety of audiences.

Early life 
Ronnie Lichtman was born in Brownsville, Brooklyn. Her late father, Emanuel Lichtman, was an optometrist and her late mother, Gertrude Lichtman, was a bookkeeper. Her parents moved Lichtman and her two brothers, Allan and Steven, to the Bronx when she was 14 years old where Lichtman attended Christopher Columbus High School.

After graduating as valedictorian from Christopher Columbus High School, Lichtman attended Brandeis University for a year, leaving to join an anti-war group in New York City called The Resistance. This was in the late 1960s during the height of the Vietnam War.

Anti-war issues led Lichtman to become involved with the Women's Liberation Movement. She started a "small consciousness-raising group" of women who worked with The Resistance. Lichtman, along with several other women, founded a woman's magazine titled Up from Under. She both wrote and edited articles for Up from Under Her article on the small group in women's liberation was widely reproduced and appeared in Gerda Lerner's anthology, The Female Experience: An American Documentary.

"Working on health care articles for the magazine made me realize how important those issues were to women," Lichtman was quoted saying in a New York Daily News article. "I knew I wanted to do something involving women, and I knew I had to go back to school. But I didn't want to do medical school because I was not really interested in pathology or disease."

Lichtman would go on to become a childbirth educator and earn a registered nursing degree from Bronx Community College in 1974 and eventually her master's and doctoral degrees from Columbia University.

Education 
 MS in Maternity Nursing, specialization in Midwifery, Columbia University
 Fellowship in Midwifery, The State University of New York at Downstate
 MPhil and PhD in Sociomedical Sciences, Columbia University

Doctoral Dissertation 
Ronnie Lichtman's doctoral dissertation was on psychosocial factors and pregnancy outcomes. Lichtman's findings were presented at the Research Forum at an American College of Nurse-Midwives (ACNM) annual meeting and at Research Day at Stony Brook University.

Professional Experience 
Ronnie Lichtman began her professional midwifery career at North Central Bronx Hospital working both in the clinic and the labor and delivery unit, caring for low-income, immigrant, and under-served women. She eventually opened a private midwifery practice that focused on well-woman gynecologic care. Lichtman, while working as a midwifery educator. She left North Central Bronx to become a midwifery faculty member at Columbia University School of Nursing where she later became Program Director. Lichtman wanted to be exposed to distance education in midwifery so she left Columbia to become Education Director of the midwifery education program at Stony Brook University. She was appointed Program Director at Stony Brook University before moving to her current position as Professor and Program Chair of the Midwifery Education Program at SUNY Downstate Medical Center in 2002.

While working primarily as a midwifery educator, Lichtman continues to practice at MIC-Fort Greene Women's Health Clinic Www.healthsolutions.org

Lichtman has assisted in over 300 births in her career, and has the birthing diaries - logs that list everything from the expecting mother's first exam to details of the birth itself - to prove it. More important, Lichtman has educated hundreds of midwives since entering the field in the mid-1970s, some of whom have gone on to deliver more than 1,500 babies each.

Contributions to the Midwifery Profession 
Lichtman served as Nominating Committee Chair for the American College of Nurse-Midwives (ACNM). She also was chair of this committee for the New York City Chapter of the organization. She has served on the Education Committee for ACNM and the Public Relations Committee for the NYC chapter. Lichtman was a member of the ACNM Diversification and Inclusion Task Force, the Task Force on Doctoral Competencies and the Task Force on Re-entry to Practice. Lichtman helped found the Peer Review Committee for the NYC chapter. She was a board member of the Caribbean Women's Health Association for several years. She was an editorial consultant to the Journal of Midwifery & Women's Health.

Lichtman has authored and edited books, book chapters, and journal and magazine articles. She travels nationwide delivering presentations and educational sessions on midwifery and women's health related topics to varied audiences.

In recognition of her many contributions, Lichtman was inducted into the American College of Nurse Midwives’ Fellowship (FACNM) in 2004.

Currently, Lichtman is working on creating a Doctorate of Midwifery (DM) program at SUNY Downstate Medical Center.

Among her significant ideas, Lichtman has suggested a new word for what midwives do at birth. Rejecting both the traditional idea of "delivering" babies (mothers deliver, not midwives) and the more whimsical "catching" babies that some midwives use (as an educator, she feels this diminishes the valuable hand skills that midwives use at birth), she has suggested the simple word "guide." She noted that this demeans neither the birthing woman nor the midwife and relates to both the midwife's role in helping women through labor and guiding the baby through the birth canal.

Research 
Ronnie Lichtman's doctoral dissertation was on Psychosocial Factors and Pregnancy Outcomes. Lichtman's findings were presented at the Research Forum at an ACNM Annual Meeting and at Research Day at Stony Brook University. She was the Principal Investigator, with Suzanne Schechter, on comparing outcomes between CNM and CM graduates of the SUNY Downstate Midwifery Education Program.

In the News/Media 
Last center standing, The Bronx Ink

A Midwife's tale, New York Daily News

Articles 
"The CM Credential and the Case for National Implementation" Journal of Midwifery & Women's Health (in press)

"Midwives Don't Deliver or Catch: A Humble Vocabulary Suggestion" Journal of Midwifery & Women's Health

"Science and Sensibility: Choice of Birth Place in the United States" Medscape Ob/Gyn

"Supporting innovations in midwifery education" Journal of Midwifery & Women's Health

"Pearls of Wisdom for Clinical Teaching: Expert Educators Reflect" Journal of Midwifery & Women's Health

"Examining Ourselves: Exploring Assumptions About Teaching Pelvic Examinations in Midwifery Education" Journal of Midwifery & Women's Health

"Perimenopausal and postmenopausal hormone replacement therapy. Part 1. An update of the literature on benefits and risks" Journal of Nurse-Midwifery

"Perimenopausal and postmenopausal hormone replacement therapy*: Part 2. Hormonal Regimens and Complementary and Alternative Therapies" Journal of Nurse-Midwifery

"Entry-level degrees for midwifery practice" Journal of Nurse-Midwifery

"Perimenopausal hormone replacement therapy: Review of the literature" Journal of Midwifery & Women's Health

"More voice for educational innovation" Journal of Nurse-Midwifery

"Coping with Postpartum Depression" American Baby

Books

References 

1950 births
Living people
American women's rights activists
American health activists
American midwives
Jewish American writers
Columbia University School of Nursing alumni
People from Brownsville, Brooklyn
Bronx Community College alumni
21st-century American Jews
21st-century American women